Beaver Country Day School is an independent, college-preparatory day school for students in grades 6 through 12 founded in 1920. The school is located on a  campus in the village of Chestnut Hill, Massachusetts, near Boston. Beaver is a member of the Cum Laude Society, the Independent Curriculum Group, and the National Association of Independent Schools. Beaver is accredited by the New England Association of Schools.

History 

Beaver was incorporated as an elementary school and an all-girls' high school in 1920 by a group of parents who were interested in progressive education and the Country Day School movement.

The school took its name in Boston, where some of the founders had been involved with a school for younger children later referred to as "Little Beaver."

Beaver's first head of school was Eugene Randolph Smith, a progressive educator and a follower of the educational reformer John Dewey; Smith had previously been head of the Park School of Baltimore. The school opened in a facility in Brookline, and moved to the present Chestnut Hill campus in the mid-1920s. Crosby Hodgman succeeded Smith as headmaster in 1943 and led the school until 1967, when Donald Nickerson became head. Nickerson resigned in 1973 and was succeeded by Philip E. McCurdy. McCurdy's successor, Jerome B. Martin led the school from 1985 until 1992, when Peter R. Hutton, took over. Peter Hutton stepped down in June 2020, and Kim Samson took over as Head of School.

From the 1930s into the early 1940s Beaver was part of the Eight-Year Study, an educational experiment to test the efficacy of progressive education. The school adopted coeducation in 1971.

Painter Beatrice Van Ness founded the art department at the school in 1921 and remained on the faculty until 1949.

Students 

Beaver offers grades 6 through 12. Enrollment (2019-2020) is 491 students, of whom 355 are in the upper school (grades 9–12) and about 136 are in the middle school (grades 6–8). Classes average about 15 students; one hundred percent of Beaver graduates go on to four-year colleges and universities. The school community is diverse, with students coming from over 60 towns in the metropolitan Boston area and speaking 20 languages besides English at home. About 25% of students and 25% of faculty are people of color. Twenty-five percent of students receive financial aid. Tuition for the 2022–2023 academic year for all grades was $58,805.

Beaver is a part of the Eastern Independent League and fields interscholastic teams in sailing, soccer, field hockey, golf, cross country, basketball, fencing, volleyball, wrestling, squash, baseball, softball, tennis, ultimate, and lacrosse. In winter of 2011–2012, Beaver started competing in girls' ice hockey. In 2015–2016, the school added boys' ice hockey as a part of their athletic program. In 2018, the school added co-ed sailing as well.

Notable alumni
 Tenley Albright, physician and winner of the 1956 Olympic gold medal in Ladies Figure Skating
 Jane Alexander, stage and film actor and former chair of the National Endowment of the Arts
 Carol Beckwith, photographer, artist, and co-author (with Angela Fisher) of Maasai, African Ceremonies (2 vols.), African Ark, Nomads of Niger, and Passages, and winner of awards from Explorers Club, UN, and Royal Geographical Society of London. 
 Eliza Dushku, actress most noted for her roles as Faith in Buffy the Vampire Slayer and Angel and as Echo in Dollhouse
 Brad Falchuk, co-creator, executive producer, writer, and director of Glee; co-creator, executive producer, and writer on "American Horror Story;" writer on Nip\Tuck 
 Jeffrey Finn, Broadway producer, nominated for 2005 Tony Award for Best Revival of a Play for On Golden Pond
 Lucinda Franks, journalist and winner of a Pulitzer Prize
 Temple Grandin, created humane cow slaughtering device. Also noted for overcoming the barriers of her autism.
 Joyce Ballou Gregorian, 1963, author
 Tammy Grimes, stage and film actress who originated the title role in The Unsinkable Molly Brown on Broadway
 Fanny Howe and Susan Howe, poets and sisters
 Jan Miner, stage actress who gained fame as Madge, the manicurist in Palmolive television ads
 Matt Selman, writer and producer for The Simpsons
 Wayne Turner, former University of Kentucky basketball star and professional basketball player
Zachary Herivaux, soccer player for Birmingham Legion
Sammy Adams, rapper, singer, songwriter

References

External links 
 School website
 The Beaver Reader online student newspaper

1920 establishments in Massachusetts
Buildings and structures in Brookline, Massachusetts
Chestnut Hill, Massachusetts
Educational institutions established in 1920
Private elementary schools in Massachusetts
Private high schools in Massachusetts
Private middle schools in Massachusetts
Private preparatory schools in Massachusetts
Schools in Norfolk County, Massachusetts